The men's 100 metres T52 event at the 2020 Summer Paralympics in Tokyo, took place on 3 September 2021.

Records
Prior to the competition, the existing records were as follows:

Results
The final took place on 3 September 2021, at 11:07:

References

Men's 100 metres T52
2021 in men's athletics